Nasîhatnâme (Naṣīḥat-nāme) were a type of guidance letter for Ottoman sultans, similar to mirrors for princes.  They draw on a variety of historical and religious sources, and were influenced by the governance of previous empires such as the Seljuk Turks or the Mongols, as well as by early Muslim history and by contemporary events.

History
Nasîhatnâme became common in the sixteenth century but built on earlier works such as the Kutadgu Bilig (Knowledge of Prosperity), written in 1070 by Yusuf Has Hacip. Early influences include the inşa literature of the Abbasid era. Some refer to Alexander the Great. 

However, nasîhatnâme are different from Byzantine Chronographia, and were written for a different audience.

Nasîhatnâme were even commissioned by aspirants to Ottoman government - including, in one case, by the Phanariot Alexandros Skarlatou Kallimaki, the probable father of Skarlatos Voyvodas Alexandrou Kallimaki. 

By the 17th century, a sense of imperial decline began to affect the content of these texts; more than just advocating a return to some golden age (i.e. Suleyman the Magnificent) they highlighted specific systemic problems in the empire - including nepotism, revolts, military defeat, and corrupt Janissaries.

Content
Nasîhatnâme typically state a clear moral reason for why they are written and presented to leaders; whether piety, or morality, or realpolitik.

Examples

Precursors
 Nasihat al-Muluk (نصيحةالملوك) (literally "advice for rulers") by al-Ghazali
 Kabusnama, (قابوسنامه) by Keykavus bin İskender
 Siyasetname (سياستنامه) by Nizamülmülk, written by order of the Seljuk emperor Melikşah.
 Ahlak-ı Nasıri (اخلاق ناصرى) (Nasırian Ethics) by Nasiruddin Tusi
 Çahar Makala (Four Discourses) by Nizamuddin Arudi
 Kitab Nasihat al-Mulk, by Al-Mawardi
 Hussain Vaiz Kashifi's Aklhaq i Muhsini (composed in Persian AH 900/AD 1495), translated into English as "The Morals Of The Beneficent" in the mid 19th century by Henry George Keene
 Al-Muqaddimah, by ibn Khaldun
 The Biographies of Illustrious Men by ibn Zafar as-Siqilli

Nasîhatnâme texts
 Tarih-i Ebü’l-Feth (History of the father of conquest), by Tursun Bey
 Destan ve Tevarih-i Müluk-i Al-i Osman, by Ahmedi
 The Asafname ("Mirror for Rulers"), by Lütfi Pasha 
 Nushatü’s Selatin (Advice to the sultans), by Gelibolulu Mustafa Ali
 Ravżatu'l-Ḥüseyn fī ḫulāṣati aḫbāri'l-ḫāfiḳeyn, by Mustafa Naima
 Hirzü’l-Mülûk (Spells of the sultans), anonymously written
 Usûlü’l-hikem fi Nizâmi’l-âlem (The principles of wisdom for the order of the world), by Hasan Kâfî el-Akhisarî
 Habnâme (Book of dreams), by Veysi.
 Kitâb-i Müstetâb (Beautiful book), anonymous.
 Risale, Koçi Bey
 Veliyüddin Telhisleri
 Kanûnnâme-i sultânî li Aziz Efendi; the identity of the author, Aziz Efendi, is unclear.
 Kitâbu mesâlihi’l-müslimîn ve menâfi’i’l-müminîn, anonymous.
 Düsturü’l-Amel li-Islahi’l-Halel, by Katip Çelebi
 Telhisü’l-beyan fi kavanin-i al-i Osman, by Hezarfan Hüseyin Efendi, who also wrote the history book Tenkîh-i Tevârih-i Mülûk

See also
Fatwa
Fiqh
Hidayah
Islamic advice literature  
Mirrors for princes
 Siyasatnama

References

Ottoman court
Wisdom literature
Ottoman literature